Lokpur (also spelled Lokepur) is a village and gram panchayat in Khoyrasol CD Block in Suri Sadar subdivision of Birbhum district in the Indian state of West Bengal.

Geography

Police station
There is a police station at Lokpur.

Demographics
As per the 2011 Census of India, Lokpur had a total population of 4,018 of which 2,022 (50%) were males and 1,996 (50%) were females. Population below 6 years was 433. The total number of literates in Lokpur was 2,614 (72.91% of the population over 6 years).

Transport
Khoyrasol-Lokpur Road links it to Khoyrasol and Lokpur-Rajnagar Road links it to Rajnagar.

Post Office
Lokpur has a delivery branch post office, with PIN 731123, under Dubrajpur sub office and Suri head office. Dubrajpur has the same PIN. Branch offices with the same PIN are Bakreswar, Balijuri, Jangaldubrajpur, Joplai, Kukutia, Lakshminarayanpur, Metela, Panditpur, Peruagopalpur and Rupaspur.

Culture
Lokpur Agrani Rural Library, a government-sponsored library, was established in 1958. It has its own pucca building.

Healthcare
There is a primary health centre with six beds at Lokpur.

References

Villages in Birbhum district